The KJ-1 is a first generation Chinese AEW (Airborne Early Warning) radar fitted to a Tupolev Tu-4 bomber. The project was started in 1969 under the code name "Project 926". (KJ is from the first characters of the Pinyin spelling of 空警, (Kōng Jǐng), short for 空中预警 (kōngzhōng yùjǐng), which means Airborne Early Warning).

Design and development
According to PRC government claims, a single KJ-1 would be equivalent to more than 40 ground radar stations, but development was stopped due to the Cultural Revolution. In the era of the Chinese economic reform, the project was once again put on hold because economic development was given top priority. When the project was finally reviewed again for the modernisation of the People's Liberation Army Air Force it was considered obsolete. In the KJ-1's place PRC developed a phased-array radar for its KJ-2000 AWACS. The sole KJ-1 is now on display at the PLAAF museum north of Beijing.

References

External links

KJ-1 at airwar.ru translated from Russian via Google translate
Photograph of KJ-1 prototype at Datangshan Museum, China
 
 

AWACS aircraft
1960s Chinese military aircraft
Aircraft manufactured in China
Four-engined tractor aircraft
Mid-wing aircraft
Four-engined turboprop aircraft